The 1952 college football season ended with the unbeaten Michigan State Spartans (9–0) and Georgia Tech Yellow Jackets (12–0) each claiming a national championship from different polls.  Michigan State finished first according to two of the "wire service" (AP and UP) polls, which both placed Georgia Tech second.  Georgia Tech was first in the (Hearst chain) International News Service poll. UP and INS merged in 1958 to form UPI.

Although the Spartans became members of the Big Ten Conference in 1950, full participation did not come until 1953, and under the terms of their entry into the conference, they were not allowed to participate in postseason play.  Georgia Tech won the Sugar Bowl on New Year's Day in New Orleans.

Conference and program changes

Conference changes
One conference changed its name this year:
The Wisconsin State Teachers College Conference, an active NCAA Division III conference currently known as the Wisconsin Intercollegiate Athletic Conference (WIAC), changed its name to the Wisconsin State College Conference

Membership changes

September
September 20 Maryland won at Missouri 13–10, and Texas won at LSU 35–14.  In the preseason poll released on September 22, 1952, the Michigan State Spartans were rated first, followed by the Maryland Terrapins.  Maryland actually had more first place votes 79 to 77, but MSU had an edge on points, 1720–1696.  The remainder of the Top Five was No. 3 Georgia Tech (which beat The Citadel 54–6), No. 4 Oklahoma and No. 5 Illinois.  Defending champion Tennessee was 6th.  As the regular season progressed, a new poll would be issued on the Monday following the weekend's games.

On September 27  No. 1 Michigan State won at Michigan, 27–13.
No. 2 Maryland beat Auburn 13–7 in Birmingham.
No. 3 Georgia Tech narrowly beat Florida 17–14 and fell to 6th place in the next poll.
No. 4 Oklahoma visited Colorado and was tied, 21–21.  
No. 5 Illinois, which beat Iowa State 33–7, rose to second place in the next poll.  No. 8 California, which was 2–0–0 after a 28–14 win over Missouri, and No. 11 Texas (which had won at North Carolina 28–7), moved into the top five.  The poll: No. 1 Michigan State, No. 2 Illinois, No. 3 Maryland, No. 4 California, and No. 5 Texas.

October

October 4 No. 1 Michigan State narrowly defeated Oregon State 17–14 at Portland.
No. 2 Illinois lost at No. 8 Wisconsin, 20–6, and would end up finishing 1952 with a losing (4–5–0) record.  No. 3 Maryland beat Clemson 28–0.  No. 4 California won at Minnesota, 49–13. No. 5 Texas lost 14-3 to No. 19 Notre Dame.  No. 6 Georgia Tech, which beat SMU 20–7 in Dallas, returned to the Top Five. The next poll featured No. 1 Wisconsin, No. 2 Michigan State, No. 3 California, No. 4 Maryland, and No. 5 Georgia Tech.

October 11  
The new No. 1, Wisconsin, lost at Columbus to unranked Ohio State, 23–14.  No. 2 Michigan State beat visiting Texas A&M 48–6.  No. 3 California beat Oregon at Portland, 41–7.
No. 4 Maryland won at Georgia, 37–0.  No. 5 Georgia Tech beat Tulane 14–0.  No. 6 Duke, which won at South Carolina 33–7, was fifth in the next poll:  No. 1 Michigan State, No. 2 Maryland, No. 3 California, No. 4 Georgia Tech, and No. 5 Duke.

October 18 No. 1 Michigan State beat visiting Syracuse 48–7. No. 2 Maryland beat No. 20 Navy 38–7.  No. 3 California beat Santa Clara 27–7.  No. 4 Georgia Tech beat Auburn 33–0.  No. 5 Duke won at N.C. State, 57–0, but was still bounced out of the top five.  No. 6 Oklahoma, which had won at No. 8 Kansas 42–20, was third in the next poll: No. 1 Michigan State, No. 2 Maryland, No. 3 Oklahoma, No. 4 California, and No. 5 Georgia Tech.

October 25  No. 1 Michigan State beat No. 17 Penn State 34–7.  No. 2 Maryland beat LSU 34–6.  No. 3 Oklahoma beat Kansas State 49–6.  In Los Angeles, a matchup of unbeaten teams pitted No. 4 California (5–0–0) against the 5–0–0 and No. 7 USC Trojans.  USC won 10–0.  Cal would lose this and the next two games after its perfect start.  No. 5 Georgia Tech beat Vanderbilt 30–0.  The next poll: No. 1 Michigan State, No. 2 Maryland, No. 3 Oklahoma, No. 4 Georgia Tech, and No. 5 USC.

November
November 1 No. 1 Michigan State narrowly won at No. 8 Purdue, 14–7.  No. 2 Maryland won at Boston University, 34–7.  No. 3 Oklahoma won at Iowa State 41–0.  No. 4 Georgia Tech (6–0–0) faced unbeaten No. 6 Duke (also 6–0–0) and won 28–7.  No. 5 USC was idle, and its place was taken by No. 7 UCLA, which handed No. 11 California a 28–7 defeat.  The next poll: No. 1 Michigan State, No. 2 Maryland, No. 3 Georgia Tech, No. 4 Oklahoma, and No. 5 UCLA.

November 8 No. 1 Michigan State won at Indiana 41–14.  No. 2 Maryland was idle.  No. 3 Georgia Tech beat Army 45–6.  No. 4 Oklahoma lost at No. 10 Notre Dame, 27–21, and dropped back out of the Top Five.  No. 5 UCLA beat visiting Oregon State 57–0.  No. 6 USC rose to fifth after a 54–7 win at Stanford.  The next poll: No. 1. Michigan State, No. 2 Georgia Tech, No. 3 Maryland, No. 4 UCLA, and No. 5 USC.

November 15 Unbeaten No. 1 Michigan State hosted once-beaten (5–1–1) No. 6 Notre Dame and won 21–3.  In Atlanta, unbeaten (8–0–0) No. 2 Georgia Tech faced once-beaten (7–1–0) No. 12 Alabama and won, 7–3.  And on the road, unbeaten (7–0–0) No. 3 Maryland lost at unbeaten (6–0–2) No. 11 Mississippi, 21–14.  No. 4 UCLA was idle.  No. 5 USC beat No. 17 Washington 33–0.  No. 8 Oklahoma, which had beaten Missouri 47–7, returned to the Top Five.  The next poll: No. 1 Michigan State, No. 2 Georgia Tech, No. 3 UCLA, No. 4 USC, and No. 5 Oklahoma.

November 22 No. 1 Michigan State won 62–13 over Marquette to close its season unbeaten.  No. 2 Georgia Tech also stayed unbeaten as it beat Florida State 30–0.  No. 3 UCLA and No. 4 USC (both 8–0–0) met in Los Angeles, with USC winning 14–12 to take the crown of the Pacific Coast Conference and a trip to the Rose Bowl. No. 5 Oklahoma beat Nebraska 34–13.  The new poll:  No. 1 Michigan State, No. 2 USC, No. 3 Georgia Tech, No. 4 Oklahoma, and No. 5 UCLA.

November 29 No. 1 Michigan State had closed its season.  No. 2 USC hosted No. 7 Notre Dame and lost 9–0.  No. 3 Georgia Tech finished its season unbeaten (11–0–0) with a 23–9 win over Georgia. The Yellow Jackets were invited to the Sugar Bowl to face unbeaten, but twice tied (8–0–2) and No. 6 Mississippi, a conference rival whom they had not faced during the regular season.  No. 4 Oklahoma closed its season at Oklahoma A&M, winning 54–7 to finish 8–1–1.  In the final AP poll, released December 1, No. 1 Michigan State was the champion, followed by No. 2 Georgia Tech, No. 3 Notre Dame, No. 4 Oklahoma, and No. 5 USC.

Conference standings

Major conference standings

Independents

Minor conferences

Minor conference standings

Rankings

Bowl games
As late as 1952, many colleges, and some football conferences, did not participate in postseason bowl games.  No. 1 Michigan State had joined the Big Ten conference in 1950 for football, but as part of the terms of membership, was ineligible to play in a bowl game until the 1953 season.  No. 3 Notre Dame had a policy against playing in postseason games.  No. 4 Oklahoma was a member of the Big 7 conference (which later, as the Big 8 and Big 12, would send its best team to the Orange Bowl), and that conference banned post-season games.  The Oklahoma University Board of Regents considered a motion to allow the team to accept an invitation from the Orange Bowl, and passed a resolution that stated that "Oklahoma belongs to the Big Seven Conference and has followed its rules in the past and should follow them in the future.".  Thus, three of the nation's four "top teams" did not play in a bowl game.  The exception was Georgia Tech, which played as the SEC champ in the Sugar Bowl.  In a forerunner of the SEC championship game, the two best teams in the conference met, with No. 7 Ole Miss accepting the invitation to play against Tech.

Heisman Trophy voting
The Heisman Trophy is given to the year's most outstanding player

Source:

See also
 1952 College Football All-America Team

References